Rohan Reid (born 3 November 1981) is a Jamaican former international footballer who played as a midfielder.

Club career
Reid has played club football in for Meadhaven United, Village United, Wadadah, Arnett Gardens, Cavalier, the Charlotte Eagles, and Tivoli Gardens.

Reid signed a one-year contract with USL Pro club Charlotte Eagles in March 2013.

International career
Reid received his first call-up to the Jamaican national side in 2007. He made his international debut in 2012. He has also played for the Jamaica national beach soccer team.

References

1981 births
Living people
Jamaican footballers
Jamaica international footballers
Meadhaven United F.C. players
Village United F.C. players
Wadadah F.C. players
Arnett Gardens F.C. players
Cavalier F.C. players
Charlotte Eagles players
Tivoli Gardens F.C. players
USL Championship players
Jamaican expatriate footballers
Expatriate soccer players in the United States
Jamaican expatriate sportspeople in the United States
Association football midfielders
National Premier League players